Lingreville is a former commune in the Manche department in Normandy in north-western France.  On 1 January 2023, Lingreville merged with Annoville to form Tourneville-sur-Mer.

See also
Communes of the Manche department

References

Former communes of Manche
Populated coastal places in France